His Wife's Husband is a 1922 British silent crime film directed by George A. Cooper and starring Madge Stuart, Olaf Hytten, and M.A. Wetherell.

Cast
 Madge Stuart as Madge Pearson  
 Olaf Hytten as Fred Pearson  
 M.A. Wetherell as Edgar Armstrong  
 Ralph Forster as Butler

References

Bibliography
 Murphy, Robert. Directors in British and Irish Cinema: A Reference Companion. British Film Institute, 2006.

External links

1922 films
1922 crime films
British silent feature films
British crime films
Films directed by George A. Cooper
British black-and-white films
1920s English-language films
1920s British films
Silent crime films